The Energy Services Union is a trade union representing workers at the ESB Group in Ireland.

The union was founded in 1959 as the Electricity Supply Board Officers' Association, and by the following year had a membership of 1,116, growing to 1,800 ten years later.  It affiliated to the Irish Congress of Trades Unions in 1976.  David Begg became its general secretary in 1982, serving for three years.

In 2012, the union renamed itself as the "Energy Services Union".

General Secretaries
1982: David Begg
1985:
1990s: Willie Cremins
2000s: Fran O'Neill

References

Trade unions established in 1959
1959 establishments in Ireland
Trade unions in the Republic of Ireland